Nabaganga is the fourth-biggest river in Bangladesh and a tributary of Mathabhanga.

Name
The river was named Nabaganga (New Ganges in Bengali) in the belief that the Ganges also derived from Mathabhanga. The Nabaganga originates near the town of Chuadanga, in Chuadanga District. It flows east, where the Kumar and the Chitra rivers join it at Magura and Narail, respectively. From here, the river turns southward, where it merges into the Bhairab River. This is a recent change, as it was once a tributary of the Ichamati River. Silt deposits changed the river's course. Efforts to steer the river back to its original course proved futile when dredging in the 1930, at Gaznavi Ghat, failed to produce the desired results. Today, the Nabaganga merges into the Kumar River after flowing through Chuadanga and Jhenaidah Districts. Most of the water in the Nabaganga River from this point on comes from the Kumar.

Course

See also
List of rivers of Bangladesh

References

Rivers of Bangladesh
Rivers of Khulna Division